The following squads and players competed in the World Women's Handball Championship in 1995 in Austria and Hungary.

Angola 

 Maria Vanga
 Rosa Torres
 Lidia Joao
 Elisa Peres
 Anica Miguel Joao Neto 
 Felisbela Teixeira 
 Filomena Jose Trindade 
 Maura Faial
 Anabela Joaquim
 Elisa Webba-Torres
 Palmira De Almeida 
 Luzia Maria Bezerra 
 Fabia Raposo 
 Maria Teresa Neto Joaquim

Austria 

 Tatyana Dzhandzhagava
 Beate Hofmann
 Annamaria Ur
 Mariann Rácz
 Sylvia Strass
 Jadranka Jez
 Rima Sypkuviene
 Edith Török 
 Nicole Peißl 
 Sorina Lefter 
 Ausra Ziukiene 
 Edith Mika
 Laura Fritz
 Stanca Bozovic 
 Iris Morhammer 
 Barbara Strass

Brazil 

 Margarida Conte
 Nivia C. Pereira Cruz
 Margarita Lobo Montao
 Janaina M. Nunes
 Idalina Borges Mesquita
 Erna Tereza Lorenzon
 Maria J. Batista Sales 
 Rosana Ferreira Aleluj 
 Lucila Vianna Da Silva 
 Eva P. Fernandes Freire
 Dilane Azambuja Roese 
 Patricia Moreira Santos
 Vanessa Pelli Veiga

Canada 

 Melanie Simard
 Veronique Noel
 Caroline Benoit
 Dominique Boivin 
 Nathalie Brochu 
 Julie Lemelin
 Carole Coté 
 Nathalie Coté 
 Debra Dyckow
 France Brunet
 Carole Martin 
 Marie-Claude Pesant

China 

 Xiaojiong Wang
 Li Mei Zhang 
 Hai Yun Chen
 Ge Li Yu
 Li Zhang
 Zhihong Che
 Yan Xia Cong 
 Chao Zhai 
 Bangping Chen 
 Li Mei Zhang
 Ying Zhao 
 Jianfang Li
 Wei Shi 
 Li Wu

Croatia 

 Adrijana Prosenjak
 Ljerka Krajnovic
 Danijela Tuda
 Koraljka Milic
 Paula Glavas
 Klaudija Klikovac-Bubalo
 Marija Celina
 Samira Hasagic 
 Renata Pavlacic 
 Ines Dogan 
 Natasa Kolega 
 Vlatka Mihoci
 Elena Nemaskalo 
 Bozica Greguric
 Katica Korosec 
 Snjezana Petika

Czech Republic 

 Lenka Cerna
 Renata Tarhaiova
 Ilona Simonova
 Petra Cumplova
 Zuzana Pospisilova 
 Zdenka Zadinova
 Marie Libanska 
 Erika Koberova 
 Zuzana Hudakova 
 Katerina Merhautova
 Nadezda Krejcirikova
 Lenka Romanova 
 Simona Roubinkova 
 Gabriela Korandova
 Gabriela Bartuskova

Denmark 

 Lene Rantala
 Susanne Munk-Lauritsen
 Conny Hamann
 Gitte Sunesen
 Rikke Solberg 
 Camilla Andersen 
 Tina Böttzau-Nielsen 
 Anette Hoffmann-Möberg 
 Marianne Florman 
 Anja Andersen
 Janne Kolling 
 Heidi Holme Astrup
 Tonje Kjaergaard 
 Gitte Madsen
 Sisse Bruun Jörgensen 
 Maybrit Nielsen

Germany 

 Michaela Schanze
 Christine Lindemann
 Eike Bram 
 Heike Murrweiß
 Miroslava Ritskiavitchius 
 Emilia Luca 
 Renata Zienkiewicz
 Csilla Elekes 
 Bianca Urbanke 
 Andrea Bölk 
 Carola Ciszewski 
 Manuela Fiedel
 Kathrin Blacha 
 Michaela Erler 
 Silke Gnad 
 Franziska Heinz

Hungary 

 Anikó Meksz
 Andrea Farkas
 Eszter Mátéfi
 Éva Erdős
 Ildikó Pádár
 Erzsébet Kocsis
 Helga Németh
 Katalin Szilágyi
 Ágnes Farkas
 Anikó Kántor
 Anikó Nagy
 Beatrix Kökény
 Beáta Hoffmann
 Beáta Siti
 Beatrix Tóth
 Anna Szántó

Ivory Coast 

 Elisabeth Kouassi
 Elisabeth Sokoury
 Elisabeth Koudo
 Mamba Diomande
 Mariam Kone 
 Namama Fadika 
 Zoromou Awa 
 Hassana Coulibaly
 Wandou Guehi 
 Fanta Traore
 Adelaide Tiba Lou
 Philomène Koko
 Cathrine Sery
 Marie-Ange Gogbe 
 Sidonie Lourougnon 
 Laurette Bodoua

Japan 

 Midori Murayama
 Kiyomi Konno
 Kayu Matsuo
 Chiaki Furuta
 Mari Obayashi
 Tomoe Ishimura 
 Izumi Tanimoto 
 Seiko Nishimura
 Emiko Kamide
 Eni Matsumoto
 Aya Inatsugi 
 Kayoko Onuki
 Yuka Yamakawa 
 Mineko Tanaka 
 Miyoko Tanaka
 Al Kojima

Norway 

 Cecilie Leganger
 Heidi Marie Tjugum
 Tonje Sagstuen 
 Kjersti Grini 
 Else Karin Bekkelund
 Annette Skotvoll
 Cathrine Svendsen
 Susann Goksör Bjerkrheim 
 Kari Solem Aune 
 Mona Dahle 
 Hege Kristine Lund Kvitsand 
 Tonje Larsen 
 Kristine Moldestad 
 Ann-Cathrin Eriksen
 Mette Davidsen

Romania 

 Carmen Moldovan-Petca
 Cristina Maria Dogaru
 Mihaela Apostol
 Mihaela Bobocea 
 Alina Nicoleta Dobrin
 Elisabeta Rosu
 Valentina Cozma 
 Lidia Draganescu 
 Mariana Tirca 
 Marinela Patru 
 Simona Iovanescu
 Marinela Györffy 
 Corina Ciolacu
 Roxana Gheorghiu 
 Steluta Lazar 
 Florica Vasile

Russia 

 Natalia Gritsenko
 Tatiana Tchernycheva 
 Raissa Verakso 
 Natalia Boudarina
 Olga Evtcherenko 
 Zhanna Sabadash
 Natalya Deriouguina 
 Larissa Kiyanitsa 
 Svetlana Mozgovaya 
 Inna Volkova
 Irina Poletaeva 
 Natalia Malakhova 
 Svetlana Priakhina 
 Irina Akhromeeva

Slovakia 

 Marianna Hamerlikova
 Marta Pernisova
 Zlatica Kotrikova
 Martina Ozima
 Lubica Ladiscova 
 Zuzana Prekopova 
 Zdenka Szabova
 Lubica Hlavata
 Lubica Kopecka
 Solana Bohunska
 Janette Palova 
 Gabriela Sabadosova
 Marcela Fecova
 Andrea Salatova 
 Marcela Vlckova 
 Irena Horvathova

South Korea 

 O-Kyeong Lim
 Jeong-Ho Hong
 Seong-Ok Oh
 Eun-Mi Kim
 Sang-Eun Lee
 Mi-Sim Kim
 Jeong-Lim Park
 Rang Kim
 Sun-Hee Han
 Eun-Kyong Kim
 Hye-Jeong Kwag
 Jung-Mi Kim
 Eun-Hee Cho
 Aeh-Kyeong Gu
 Young-Ran Oh
 Gyeong-Ja Moon

Sweden 

 Kristina Jönsson
 Anna-Lena Pihl
 Eva Olsson
 Camilla Eriksson
 Gunilla Olsson 
 Helen Benjaminsson
 Karin Nilsson 
 Lotta Engström 
 Lina Olsson 
 Tuija Pasanen 
 Lena Nilsson
 Jessica Everlönn
 Ulrika Karlsson 
 Asa Lundmark 
 Asa Elisabeth Eriksson

Ukraine 

 Elena Galkina
 Svetlana Morozova
 Ganna Kryvoruchko
 Oksana Pavlik 
 Larissa Kouzmenko 
 Nataliya Derepasko 
 Svetlana Lelyuk 
 Tetyana Novikova
 Irina Korotkevic
 Nataliya Martynienko 
 Elena Putrya 
 Olena Radchenko 
 Tetyana Pereverzeva
 Tetyana Drobinko

USA 

 Tami Jameson
 Jennifer Demby-Horton
 Toni Jameson
 Dawn Marple 
 Laura Coenen 
 Sharon Cain 
 Kristen Danihy
 Kim Clarke
 Dannette Leininger 
 Chryssandra Watts-Hires 
 Dawn Allinger
 Pat Neder 
 Tonia Stubbs

References 

World Women's Handball Championship squads
World Handball Championship squads